The Status Quo is an understanding among religious communities with respect to nine shared religious sites in Jerusalem and Bethlehem. Other Holy Places in Israel and Palestine were not deemed subject to the Status Quo, because the authorities of one religion or community within a religion are in recognized or effective possession of them.

The status quo stemmed from a firman (decree) of Ottoman sultan Osman III in 1757 that preserved the division of ownership and responsibilities of various Christian holy places. Further firmans issued in 1852 and 1853 affirmed that no changes could be made without consensus from all six Christian communities; these firmans received international recognition in Article 9 of the Treaty of Paris (1856). The term "status quo" was first used in regard to the Holy Places in the Treaty of Berlin (1878).

The 1929 summary prepared by L. G. A. Cust, The Status Quo in the Holy Places, became the standard text on the subject, and the details were further formalized in the 1949 United Nations Conciliation Commission after the 1947–1949 Palestine war.

History

Controlled by the Roman Empire and then, following its division, by the Eastern Roman (Byzantine) Empire, these eastern sites first became a point of contention in the centuries following 1054, when the Roman Catholic Church and the Eastern Orthodox Church separated. Following the seizure of the Holy Land by knights from the West in the First Crusade, the Catholic church became the custodian of the churches in Jerusalem. With the defeat of the crusader states and the rise of the Ottoman Empire, control of the sites oscillated between the Catholic (Latin) and the Orthodox (Greek) churches, depending upon which could obtain a favorable firman (decree) from the Ottoman "Sublime Porte" at a particular time, often through outright bribery. Violent clashes were not uncommon. There was no agreement about this question, although it was discussed at the negotiations to the Treaty of Karlowitz in 1699.

During the Holy Week of 1757, Orthodox Christians reportedly took over some of the Franciscan-controlled church, possibly leading Sultan Osman III to write a 1757 decree forming the basis of the status quo. In the years preceding the Crimean War (1853–1856), Napoleon III of France pressured the sultan to invalidate the 1757 status quo in favor of the Catholic church, leading in part to Nicholas I of Russia declaring war in favor of the Orthodox church's rights. This resulted in 1852 and 1853 firmans by Sultan Abdülmecid I which received international recognition in Article 9 of the Treaty of Paris (1856) leaving the status quo intact. The existing territorial division was solidified amongst the communities, the treaty stating that "The actual status quo will be maintained and the Jerusalem shrines, whether owned in common or exclusively by the Greek, Latin, and Armenian communities, will all remain forever in their present state." Despite this declaration, there are no unanimous terms defining the status quo, sometimes causing contradictory differences of opinion.

Despite the arguments over who would control what aspects of these sites, the Status Quo has remained largely intact from the 18th century to the present.

The term "status quo" was first used in regards to the Holy Places in Article 62 of the Treaty of Berlin (1878). A summary of the Status Quo prepared by L. G. A. Cust, a civil servant of the British Mandate, The Status Quo in the Holy Places, quickly became the standard text on the subject.

Sites

According to the United Nations Conciliation Commission, the Status Quo applies to nine sites in Jerusalem and Bethlehem, which Cust separates into three categories:

Disputed between Christian denominations
 The Church of the Holy Sepulchre and its dependencies, Jerusalem
 The Deir es-Sultan, on top of the Church of the Holy Sepulchre, Jerusalem
 The Tomb of the Virgin Mary, Jerusalem
 The Church of the Nativity, Bethlehem
 The Chapel of the Milk Grotto, Bethlehem (no records exist)
 The Chapel of the Shepherd's Field, Bethlehem (no records exist)

Disputed between Christians and Muslims
 The Chapel of the Ascension, Jerusalem

Disputed between Jews and Muslims
 The Western Wall, Jerusalem
 Rachel's Tomb, Bethlehem

Related: David's Tomb and Cenacle
 David's Tomb and Cenacle: not part of the Status quo arrangement during the British Mandate, it is nevertheless in a similar position, being disputed by the Catholics who have built the current structure, the Muslims (the Ottoman sultan confiscated it from the Franciscans), and Jewish and Israeli institutions, who took control of it in 1948.

'Immovable ladder'
The so-called immovable ladder under the window of the Church of the Holy Sepulchre, made of Lebanon cedar wood, was in place by 1728 and has remained there ever since the 1757 status quo was established, aside from being temporarily moved twice. The ladder is referred to as immovable due to the agreement of the Status Quo that no cleric of the six Churches may move, rearrange, or alter any property without the consent of the other five orders.

According to various accounts, the ladder once belonged to a mason who was doing restoration work in the Church of the Holy Sepulchre. Jerome Murphy-O'Connor states that "the ladder was first introduced at a time when the Ottomans taxed Christian clergy every time they left and entered the Holy Sepulchre." The Catholics adapted by setting up quarters inside the church. O'Connor continues:
The window, ladder and ledge all belong to the Armenians. The ledge served as a balcony for the Armenian clergy resident in the Holy Sepulchre, and they reached it via the ladder. It was their only opportunity to get fresh air and sunshine. At one stage, apparently, they also grew fresh vegetables on the ledge.

The earliest record of the ladder is in a 1728 engraving by Elzearius Horn. In 1757, the same year the Status Quo was introduced, Ottoman sultan Abdul Hamid I mentioned the ladder in a firman, and because everything was to be left “as it was” according to the royal decree, the ladder had to stay as it was too.
An 1842 lithograph by David Roberts also shows the ladder in place. The earliest photograph showing the ladder dates from the 1850s. By the end of the 19th century, the ladder was being used to bring food to Armenian monks imprisoned by the Turks. Turkish accounts mention the ladder being used by Armenian monks to clean the windows above the ledge. The Byzantine cornice the ladder rests on has been used by the public during festivals.

During his pilgrimage to the Holy Land in 1964, Pope Paul VI described the ladder as a visible symbol of Christian division. In 1997, the ladder was supposedly pulled in through the window and hidden behind an altar by a Protestant Christian intending "to make a point of the silliness of the argument over whose ledge it is." It was returned to the ledge weeks later, and a grate was installed in the window.
In 2009, the ladder was placed against the left window for a short period before being moved back again.

See also
Church of the Holy Sepulchre § Status Quo
Church of the Nativity § Property and administration
David's Tomb, not subject to the status quo, but of its own Muslim waqf
Simultaneum
Status quo (Israel)
Temple Mount entry restrictions

References
Footnotes

Citations

Sources
 
 
 Marlen Eordegian (2003), "British and Israeli Maintenance of the Status Quo in the Holy Places of Christendom", International Journal of Middle East Studies, Vol. 35, No. 2 (May, 2003), pp. 307–328

External links
  L. G. A. Cust's 1929 summary of the Status Quo history and regulations, with plans and photos
 Custody of the Holy Land, Status Quo – a short overview
 Aviva and Shmuel Bar-Am, "1,000 years of rivalry – and a little bit of harmony – at the Church of the Holy Sepulcher", in Times of Israel, 7 September 2012

Archaeological sites in Jerusalem
Christian holy places
Christian pilgrimages
18th century in Jerusalem
Islamic holy places
Jewish holy places
Jews in Ottoman Palestine
Ladders
Ottoman law
Religious buildings and structures in Jerusalem
Religion in Jerusalem
Tabernacle and Temples in Jerusalem
Temple Mount
Tradition
Western Wall
 
Ministry of Endowments and Islamic Affairs (Jordan)